Dunkleosteoidea is an extinct superfamily of arthrodire placoderms that lived during the Devonian period. The gigantic apex predator Dunkleosteus terrelli is the best known member of this group.

Phylogeny
Eubrachythoraci is divided into the clades Coccosteomorphi and Pachyosteomorphi, the latter of which can be further sub-divided into Aspinothoracidi and Dunkleosteoidea. Dunkleosteoidea was then considered to consist of the two sister families Dunkleosteidae and Panxiosteidae.

However, the 2016 Zhu et al. phylogenetic study using a larger morphological dataset recovered Panxiosteidae well outside of Dunkleosteoidea, leaving the status of Dunkleosteidae as a clade grouping separate from Dunkleosteoidea in doubt, as shown in the cladogram below:

References 

Arthrodires
Early Devonian first appearances
Late Devonian animals
Late Devonian extinctions